Hercules Inlet is a large, narrow, ice-filled inlet which forms a part of the southwestern margin of the Ronne Ice Shelf. It is bounded on the west by the south-eastern flank of the Heritage Range, and on the north by Skytrain Ice Rise. Hercules Inlet marks the southern end of Zumberge Coast and the northwestern end of Queen Elizabeth Land. The inlet was named by the Advisory Committee on Antarctic Names for the LC-130 Hercules aircraft used by the U.S. Naval Support Force, Antarctica, as a photographic and load carrying plane.

Hercules Inlet is one of the common starting points for long distance expeditions to the South Pole, taking anywhere from 25 to 81 days.

The first expedition from Hercules Inlet to the South Pole took place in 1998, led by Martyn Williams. This 50-day expedition opened up the doorway for  South Pole overland journeys, and has become the classic route for  most expeditions. British Army officer Preet Chandi, known for being the first woman of colour to complete a solo expedition to the South Pole, used this route, setting off from Hercules inlet in November 2022.

The slopes south of the inlet area are covered in crevasse fields, making travel through them treacherous without prior knowledge of their whereabouts.  The Wilson Nunataks can be seen from the inlet as well.

References

Inlets of Antarctica
Filchner-Ronne Ice Shelf
Bodies of water of Queen Elizabeth Land